Moon Beams is a 1962 album by jazz musician Bill Evans, and the first trio album recorded by Evans after the death of bassist Scott LaFaro.

Music and releases
With Chuck Israels on bass taking the place of LaFaro, Evans recorded several songs during these May and June 1962 sessions. Moon Beams contains a collection of ballads recorded during this period. The more uptempo tunes were put on How My Heart Sings! In 2012, Riverside released a new remastered edition which includes three previously unreleased alternative takes. Moon Beams and How My Heart Sings! were also released combined as the double album The Second Trio. The woman on the album cover is Nico, who would later achieve recognition as a musical artist herself.

Reception

Writing for Allmusic, music critic Thom Jurek wrote of the album "...selections are so well paced and sequenced the record feels like a dream... Moonbeams was a startling return to the recording sphere and a major advancement in his development as a leader."

Track listing

Bonus tracks on 2012 CD reissue:

Personnel
Bill Evans - piano
Chuck Israels - bass
Paul Motian - drums

Production
Orrin Keepnews - producer
Pete Sahula - photographer
Nico - photographic model
Ken Deardoff - album design

References

External links
The Bill Evans Memorial Library

1962 albums
Albums produced by Orrin Keepnews
Bill Evans albums
Riverside Records albums